Pyrophaena  is a subgenus of the hoverfly genus Platycheirus distinctive enough to sometimes treated as a separate genus in its own right. Indeed a recent study of the phylogeny of the subfamily Syrphinae found it to be closer to other certain other genera – Rohdendorfia, Syrphocheilosia and Spazigaster. Since only a few species were sampled the true systematic structure must await a more thorough survey of Platycheirus and related genera.

Species
P. granditarsus (Forster, 1771)
P. rosarum (Fabricius, 1787)

References

Diptera of Europe
Insect subgenera